The 1977 NCAA Division II basketball tournament involved 32 schools playing in a single-elimination tournament to determine the national champion of men's NCAA Division II college basketball as a culmination of the 1976–77 NCAA Division II men's basketball season. It was won by the University of Tennessee at Chattanooga and Chattanooga's Wayne Golden was the Most Outstanding Player.

Regional participants

*denotes tie

Regionals

South Atlantic - Towson, Maryland
Location: Towson Center Host: Towson State University

Third Place - Virginia Union 107, Winston-Salem 93

New England - Fairfield, Connecticut
Location: SHU Gymnasium Host: Sacred Heart University

Third Place - Assumption 86, Bridgeport 84

South - Chattanooga, Tennessee
Location: Maclellan Gymnasium Host: University of Tennessee at Chattanooga

Third Place - Valdosta State 83, Armstrong Atlantic 73

North Central - Green Bay, Wisconsin
Location: Brown County Veterans Memorial Arena Host: University of Wisconsin at Green Bay

Third Place - Nebraska–Omaha 93, Augustana 91

Great Lakes - Youngstown, Ohio
Location: Beeghly Center Host: Youngstown State University

Third Place - Youngstown State 81, Bellarmine 79

East - Erie, Pennsylvania
Location: Hammermill Center Host: Gannon University

Third Place - Gannon 85, Philadelphia Textile 67

South Central - Florence, Alabama
Location: Flowers Hall Host: University of North Alabama

Third Place - Lincoln 103, Southern 87

West - Tacoma, Washington
Location: Memorial Fieldhouse Host: University of Puget Sound

Third Place - Seattle Pacific 94, Cal State Hayward 74

*denotes each overtime played

National Quarterfinals

National Finals - Springfield, Massachusetts
Location: Springfield Civic Center Hosts: American International College and Springfield College

Third Place - North Alabama 93, Sacred Heart 77

*denotes each overtime played

All-tournament team
 Joe Allen (Randolph-Macon)
 Otis Boddie (North Alabama)
 Wayne Golden (Tennessee-Chattanooga)
 William Gordon (Tennessee-Chattanooga)
 Hector Olivencia (Sacred Heart)

See also
1977 NCAA Division I basketball tournament
1977 NCAA Division III basketball tournament
1977 NAIA Basketball Tournament

References

Sources
 2010 NCAA Men's Basketball Championship Tournament Records and Statistics: Division II men's basketball Championship
 1977 NCAA Division II men's basketball tournament jonfmorse.com

NCAA Division II men's basketball tournament
Tournament
NCAA Division II basketball tournament
NCAA Division II basketball tournament